Tom Murray may refer to:

Sports

Association football
Tom Murray (footballer, born 1889), English footballer
Tommy Murray (footballer, born January 1933), Scottish football outside right for Falkirk, Queen of the South, Leeds and Tranmere
Tommy Murray (footballer, born February 1933), Scottish football inside forward for Darlington, St. Johnstone, Alloa, Albion Rovers and Stranraer
Tommy Murray (footballer, born 1943), Scottish footballer

Other sports
Tom Murray (baseball) (1866–?), Major League Baseball pitcher
Tom Murray (curler) (1877–1944), Scottish winner of the Olympic Gold medal in curling at the inaugural Winter Olympics in Chamonix, France
Tom Murray (golfer) (born 1990), English golfer
Tom Murray (American rower) (born 1969), American rower
Tom Murray (New Zealand rower) (born 1994), New Zealand rower
Tommy Murray (ice hockey) (1893–1963), American ice hockey goalie

Others
Tom Murray (musician), drummer for The Litter
Tom Murray (actor) (1874–1935), American silent-era actor
Tom J. Murray (1894–1971), American politician

See also
Thomas Murray (disambiguation)